D. Jagatheesa Pandian (born 11 May 1955) is an Indian civil servant. He is the current Vice President and Chief Investment Officer of Asian Infrastructure Investment Bank. He previously served as IAS officer of Gujarat cadre and Chief Secretary of Gujarat.

Education 
Pandian has a graduate (BBA) and a postgraduate degree (MBA) in Business Administration from the University of Madras. He also has a doctorate (PhD) in energy security.

Career

As an IAS officer 
Pandian served in various key positions for both the Union Government and the Government of Gujarat during his career, like as the Chief Secretary of Gujarat, Additional Chief Secretary (Industries and Mines), Principal Secretary (Energy and Petrochemicals), Managing Director of Gujarat State Petroleum Corporation (GSPC), Vice Chairman and Managing Director of Gujarat Mineral Development Corporation (GMDC), Managing Director of Directorate of Information and Technology, and as the District Magistrate and Collector of Kheda and Bharuch districts in the Gujarat Government, and as a Director/Deputy Secretary in the Department of Economic Affairs of Ministry of Finance in the Union Government.

Pandian also had a stint in the World Bank.

Chief Secretary of Gujarat 
Pandian was appointed as the Chief Secretary of Gujarat by the Chief Minister of Gujarat in October 2014, Pandian assumed the office of Chief Secretary on 1 November 2014, and demitted it and simultaneously superannuated from service on 31 May 2015.

Post retirement 
Post his retirement from IAS, Pandian was appointed as the Vice President and Chief Investment Officer of the Asian Infrastructure Investment Bank in February 2016.

References

External links 
 Executive Record Sheet as maintained by Department of Personnel and Training of Government of India
 Profile at Asian Infrastructure Investment Bank's website
 Executive Profile as maintained by Bloomberg

Indian Administrative Service officers
Living people
People from Tamil Nadu
1955 births
Chief investment officers